The 108th New York Infantry Regiment was an infantry regiment in the Union Army during the American Civil War.

Formation
The 108th New York Infantry was organized at Camp Fitz John Porter in Rochester, New York, and mustered in for three years service on August 18, 1862, under the command of Colonel Oliver Hazard Palmer.

The regiment was attached to Whipple's Command, Defenses of Washington, D.C., to September 1862. 2nd Brigade, 3rd Division, II Corps, Army of the Potomac, to March 1864. 3rd Brigade, 2nd Division, II Corps, to May 1865.

The 108th New York Infantry mustered out of service on May 28, 1865. Veterans and recruits were transferred to the 59th New York Infantry.

Detailed service

Moved to New York City August 19, then to Washington, D.C., August 22, 1862. Maryland Campaign September 6–22, 1862. Battle of Antietam, Md., September 16–17. (Regiment lost 196 killed and wounded in its first battle.) Duty at Harpers Ferry, Va., September 22 to October 30. Reconnaissance to Charleston October 16–17. Advance up Loudoun Valley and movement to Falmouth, Va., October 30 – November 17. Battle of Fredericksburg, Va., December 12–15. At Falmouth until April 27, 1863. "Mud March" January 20–24. Chancellorsville Campaign April 27 – May 6. Battle of Chancellorsville May 1–5. Gettysburg Campaign June 11 – July 24. Battle of Gettysburg July 1–3. Pursuit of Lee to Manassas Gap, Va., July 5–24. Duty along Orange & Alexandria Railroad until September 12. Advance from the Rappahannock to the Rapidan September 13–17. Picket duty on the Rapidan until October 8. Bristoe Campaign October 8–22. Auburn and Bristoe October 14. Advance to line of the Rappahannock November 7–8. Mine Run Campaign November 26 – December 2. At Stevensburg until May, 1864. Demonstration on the Rapidan February 6–7. Morton's Ford February 6–7. Campaign from the Rapidan to the James May 1 – June 15. Battles of the Wilderness May 5–7. Laurel Hill May 8. Spotsylvania May 8–12. Po River May 10. Spotsylvania Court House May 12–21. Assault on the Salient or "Bloody Angle" May 12. North Anna River May 23–26. On line of the Pamunkey May 26–28. Totopotomoy May 28–31. Cold Harbor June 1–12. Before Petersburg June 16–18. Siege of Petersburg June 16, 1864, to April 2, 1865. Jerusalem Plank Road June 22–23, 1864. Demonstration north of the James July 27–29. Deep Bottom July 27–28. Demonstration north of the James August 13–20. Strawberry Plains, Deep Bottom, August 14–18. Ream's Station August 25. Boydton Plank Road, Hatcher's Run, October 27–28. Dabney's Mills, Hatcher's Run, February 5–7, 1865. Appomattox Campaign March 28 – April 9. Boydton and White Oak Roads March 29–31. Crow's House March 31. Fall of Petersburg April 2. Sailor's Creek April 6. High Bridge and Farmville April 7. Appomattox Court House April 9. Surrender of Lee and his army. At Burkesville until May 2. March to Washington, D.C., May 2–12. Grand Review of the Armies May 23.

Casualties
The regiment lost a total of 191 men during service; 9 officers and 95 enlisted men killed or mortally wounded, 87 enlisted men died of disease.

Commanders
 Colonel Oliver Hazard Palmer
 Colonel Charles James Powers - commanded at the Battle of Fredericksburg while still at the rank of lieutenant colonel
 Colonel Francis Edwin Pierce - commanded at the Battle of Gettysburg while still at the rank of lieutenant colonel

Notable members
 Corporal William H. Raymond, Company A - Medal of Honor recipient for action at the Battle of Gettsyburg, July 3, 1863
 Private Henry Niles, Company K - captured the colors of the 14th North Carolina Infantry at the Battle of Antietam

See also

 List of New York Civil War regiments
 New York in the Civil War

References
 Barcotte, Bob. The Civil War Battles of Lt. Col. Francis Edwin Pierce, 108th New York Volunteer Infantry (Rochester, NY: Rochester Public Library), 2003.
 Dyer, Frederick H. A Compendium of the War of the Rebellion (Des Moines, IA:  Dyer Pub. Co.), 1908.
 Murray, R. L. Before the Appointed Time: The History of the 108th New York at Antietam (Wolcott, NY: Benedum Books), 2001. 
 Palmer, Oliver Hazard. The Civil War Diary of Oliver Hazard Palmer (Santa Monica, CA: Peter Legh Garrett), 1997.
 Stockton, Mark L. Samuel B.: The life and Adventures of Samuel B. Delano (1845–1917) (S.l.: The Author), 2003.
 Washburn, George H. A Complete Military History and Record of the 108th Regiment N.Y. Vols., from 1862 to 1894 (Rochester, NY: Press of E. R. Andrews), 1894.
Attribution

External links
 108th New York Infantry monument at Gettysburg Battlefield

Military units and formations established in 1862
Military units and formations disestablished in 1865
Infantry 108